Liechtenstein Castle is a privately owned castle near Maria Enzersdorf in Lower Austria, bordering Vienna. It is on the edge of the Wienerwald (Vienna Woods). The castle, originally built during the 12th century, was destroyed by the Ottomans in the siege of Vienna in 1529, and again in the Battle of Vienna in 1683, and it remained in ruins until 1884, when it was rebuilt with the help of architect Carl Gangolf Kayser.

Liechtenstein (German for "bright stone") Castle is the place of origin of the House of Liechtenstein, the ruling family of the Principality of Liechtenstein. The family owned the castle from at least 1140 until the 13th century, and again from 1808 to the present.

Today, the castle hosts the Nestroy Theatre Festival, which is held annually during the summer months. The 1969 film A Walk with Love and Death, the 1971 film The Vampire Happening, the 1979 film The Fifth Musketeer, and the 1993 film The Three Musketeers featured shots of the castle.

See also
Vaduz Castle in Liechtenstein – the official residence of the Princely Family of Liechtenstein

References

External links
 Castle Liechtenstein Information in German
 Burg Liechtenstein, Maria Enzersdorf Information in German

Liechtenstein

Establishments in the Duchy of Austria